Andrei Viktorovich Talalaev (born 5 October 1972) is a Russian professional football coach, television commentator and a former player. He is the manager of FC Torpedo Moscow.

Career

Club
Talalaev made his professional debut in the Soviet Top League in 1991 for FC Torpedo Moscow.

Managerial
On 12 June 2018, Talalaev signed a 2-year contract with the Armenian club FC Pyunik.

On 2 December 2018, during Pyunik's match against Gandzasar Kapan, Talalaev was sent off for insulting the fourth official. Talalaev was subsequently banned from football until the end of the season, 31 May 2019, on 6 December 2018.

On 10 April 2019, he returned to Russia, signing with FC Khimki. He resigned from Khimki on 23 January 2020 with the club in 3rd place after the club announced their budget will be reduced.

On 28 June 2020, he signed a 2-year contract with Russian Premier League club PFC Krylia Sovetov Samara, with the club in the last position in the standings. At the end of the 2019–20 season, Krylia Sovetov was relegated and Talalaev resigned on 25 July 2020.

On 26 July 2020, he joined Russian Premier League club FC Akhmat Grozny. That was the second time in 15 months that he replaced Igor Shalimov as a manager (Shalimov was the manager of FC Khimki before Talalaev was hired there). Talalaev was dismissed by Akhmat on 11 September 2022.

On 13 October 2022, Talalaev was hired by FC Torpedo Moscow.

Honours
 Soviet Top League bronze: 1991.
 Russian Cup winner: 1993.

European club competitions
With FC Torpedo Moscow.

 UEFA Cup 1991–92: 3 games.
 UEFA Cup 1992–93: 3 games, 1 goal.
 UEFA Cup Winners' Cup 1993–94: 2 games.

References

1972 births
Footballers from Moscow
Living people
Soviet footballers
Association football forwards
Russian footballers
Russia under-21 international footballers
Russian expatriate footballers
Expatriate footballers in Italy
Soviet Top League players
Russian Premier League players
Serie B players
FC Torpedo Moscow players
FC Torpedo-2 players
FC KAMAZ Naberezhnye Chelny players
FC Tyumen players
FC Tom Tomsk players
Treviso F.B.C. 1993 players
FC Lokomotiv Nizhny Novgorod players
Russian football managers
Association football commentators
FC Rostov managers
Russian Premier League managers
FC Volga Nizhny Novgorod managers
FC Pyunik managers
FC Khimki managers
PFC Krylia Sovetov Samara managers
FC Akhmat Grozny managers
FC Torpedo Moscow managers
Russian expatriate football managers
Expatriate football managers in Armenia